Gucin may refer to the following places:
Gucin, Łódź Voivodeship (central Poland)
Gucin, Grójec County in Masovian Voivodeship (east-central Poland)
Gucin, Płońsk County in Masovian Voivodeship (east-central Poland)
Gucin, Warmian-Masurian Voivodeship (north Poland)